Janet Dean Fodor (born 1942) is distinguished professor emerita of linguistics at the City University of New York.   Her primary field is psycholinguistics,  and her research interests include human sentence processing, prosody, learnability theory and L1 (first-language) acquisition.

Life
Born Janet Dean, she grew up in England and received her B.A. in 1964 and her M.A. in 1966, both from Oxford University. At Oxford she was a student of the social psychologist Michael Argyle, and their 'equilibrium hypothesis' for nonverbal communication became the basis for affiliative conflict theory: if participants feel the degree of intimacy suggested by a channel of nonverbal communication to be too high, they act to reduce the intimacy conveyed through other channels. She received her Ph.D. in 1970 from MIT, looking at the challenge posed by opaque contexts for semantic compositionality. She came to the Graduate Center at CUNY from the University of Connecticut in 1986 as a distinguished professor of linguistics. In 1988, Fodor founded the CUNY Conference on Human Sentence Processing. Fodor supervised ca 27 dissertations of students from both CUNY and the University of Connecticut. 

She was awarded a Guggenheim Fellowship in 1992. She was President of the Linguistic Society of America in 1997 and was named a Fellow of the Linguistic Society of America in 2006. In 2014, she was elected a Corresponding Fellow of the British Academy. A volume of papers in her honor, Explicit and Implicit Prosody in Sentence Processing, was published in 2015. In 2017, she received an honorary doctorate from the Paris Diderot University.

She was married to Jerry Alan Fodor until his death in 2017.

Summary of major publications

A New Two-Stage Parsing Model 
Fodor and Lyn Frazier proposed a new two-stage model of parsing human sentences and the syntactic analysis of these sentences. The first step of this new model is to “assign lexical and phrasal nodes to groups of words within the lexical string that is received”. The second step is to add higher nonterminal nodes and combines these newly created phrases into a sentence. Fodor and Frazier suggest this new method because it can transcend the complexities of language by parsing only a few words at a time. Their model is based on the assumption that initial parsing occurs via the length of the phrase, not the syntactic meaning.

Comprehending Sentence Structure 
Through a series of sentence analyses, Fodor found that the “WH-trace appears in mental representations of sentence structure, but NP-trace does not”. WH-trace is the placement of interrogative words (who, what, where) in a sentence. Her findings did not support those of McElree, Bever, or MacDonald, but she acknowledges that there are different types of sentences that are going to create linguistic issues that linguists don’t know how to deal with yet. Using this same data, Fodor also finds that passive verbs are more memorable than adjectives during language production.

Psycholinguistics Cannot Escape Prosody 
In this article, Fodor emphasizes the importance of integrating prosody into research on sentence processing. She argues that past research has focused on syntactic and semantic analysis of sentences, but people use prosody when reading, which affects reading comprehension and sentence analysis. She also brings up the idea that people use prosody when writing, not just reading, which further affects sentence production and sentence structure. She blames technology for this new need, largely because of the newfound availability of information.

Empty Categories in Sentence Processing 
Building off of the work of her doctoral advisor, Noam Chomsky, Fodor wrote an article on the importance of identifying empty categories in sentence processing. Empty categories can “account for certain regularities of sentence structure”, and attaching it with a previous word or phrase can help determine what it means. Figuring out and understanding the meaning of empty categories requires a linguistic background, but all language-speakers have the ability to use empty categories.

Selected works
 Argyle, Michael & Janet Dean. 1965. Eye Contact, Distance and Affiliation. Sociometry 28, 289-304.
 Fodor, Janet Dean. 1970. The linguistic description of opaque contexts, PhD thesis, MIT. Published by Garland in 1979; republished by Routledge in 2014.
 Fodor, Janet Dean. 1977. Semantics: theories of meaning in generative grammar. Thomas Y. Crowell Co., publisher. 
 Fodor, Janet Dean and Fernanda Ferreira (eds.) 1998. Reanalysis in sentence processing. Springer Verlag.

References

External links
 Janet Dean Fodor's homepage
 2015 CUNY Conference on Human Sentence Processing 

City University of New York faculty
Women cognitive scientists
Living people
1942 births
Linguists from the United States
Psycholinguists
Alumni of the University of Oxford
Women linguists
Fellows of the Cognitive Science Society
Linguistic Society of America presidents
Corresponding Fellows of the British Academy
Fellows of the Linguistic Society of America